John Starling may refer to:

John Starling (MP), MP for Ipswich, 1402–1413, son of Geoffrey Starling
John Henry Starling (1883–1966), Australian public servant
John Starling (musician), American bluegrass musician